Ronald Owens (February 4, 1930 – June 8, 2005) was an American Democratic Party politician who served in the New Jersey General Assembly from 1966 to 1978.

Born in Newark, Owens graduated from Central High School in 1948 and earned a B.A. in political science from Rutgers University in 1953. After serving in the Signal Corps from 1953 to 1955, he became a teacher in the Newark Public Schools. Later, he attended Seton Hall University where he earned a law degree, was admitted to the New Jersey Bar in 1962, and opened a law practice in Newark.

Owens was a member of the Newark Board of Education from 1963 to 1966. In 1965, he was elected to the General Assembly from an at-large seat consisting of nine members from Essex County. Then in 1967, he was elected to the new District 11B in Essex County and reelected there in 1969. In 1971, he was reelected in District 11A centered about the South Ward of Newark and Ironbound and was reelected two more times in a similar district then numbered the 29th. He did not run for reelection in 1977.

He died on June 8, 2005.

References

1930 births
2005 deaths
Democratic Party members of the New Jersey General Assembly
Politicians from Newark, New Jersey
African-American state legislators in New Jersey
School board members in New Jersey
Central High School (Newark, New Jersey) alumni
Rutgers University alumni
Seton Hall University School of Law alumni
Educators from New Jersey
New Jersey lawyers
20th-century American politicians
20th-century American lawyers
20th-century African-American politicians
21st-century African-American people